Land of Dreams is the fifth solo studio album from Take That band member, Mark Owen. The album was released on 23 September 2022, nine years after his fourth album. The album was preceded by three singles: "You Only Want Me", "Are You Looking for Billy?" and "Magic".

Background
On 1 February 2022, it was revealed that Owen had been writing new material. A source close to Owen said, "He has been writing some songs and they are sounding pretty good. It's said the singer will be performing at the Isle of Wight Festival in June, It is early days, but he is [...] toying with the idea of another solo record. Nothing is nailed down, but given he has done a solo album every 10 years or so for the last two decades, now feels like a nice time to think about it again."

Commercial performance
On the midweek UK Albums Chart dated 26 September 2022, Land of Dreams was at number two. On 30 September 2022, the album debuted at number 5 on the UK Official Albums Chart Top 100, and at number 3 on the UK Album Downloads and Sales Charts.

Track listing

Notes 
  signifies a co-producer
  signifies an additional producer
  signifies a vocal producer

Charts

References

2022 albums
Mark Owen albums
Albums produced by Cutfather